The Banffshire by-election was a Parliamentary by-election held on 16 February 1907. The constituency returned one Member of Parliament (MP) to the House of Commons of the United Kingdom, elected by the first past the post voting system.

Vacancy
The by-election was held due to the death of the incumbent Liberal MP, Alexander William Black on 29 December 1906. He died from injuries received in the Elliot Junction rail accident, forcing a by-election early in 1907.

Electoral history
Black had been Liberal MP for the seat of Banffshire since the 1900 General Election. The seat had been Liberal since they gained it in 1837. They had easily held the seat at the last election, with an increased majority;

Candidates
The local Liberal Association selected 31-year-old Walter Waring to defend the seat. Waring was the son of Charles Waring, former Liberal Member of Parliament for Poole. He was unsuccessful Liberal candidate in Wigtonshire in the 1906 general election.
The Conservatives chose 39-year-old William Whitelaw as their candidate. Whitelaw was elected at the 1892 general election as the Member of Parliament (MP) for Perth, but lost his seat at the 1895 general election and was defeated when he stood again in 1900. He was a director of the Highland Railway (HR) since 1898, and Chairman of the HR since 1902.

Campaign
Polling Day was fixed for 16 February 1907.

Result
The Liberals held the seat with a slightly reduced majority;

The Liberal vote share of 67.3%, though less than in 1906, was higher than any other Liberal vote share since before 1885.

Aftermath
Waring was re-elected at the following general election against a new Conservative opponent;

Whitelaw did not stand for parliament again.

References

Banffshire by-election
1900s elections in Scotland
Banffshire by-election
Banffshire by-election
By-elections to the Parliament of the United Kingdom in Scottish constituencies